A list of crime films released in the 1940s.

Notes

Crime films
1940s